Vladimir Kostyukov (14 October 1954 – 17 December 2015) was a Belarusian professional football player and later coach. He spent the majority of his playing and entire coaching career in Dnepr Mogilev. Over the years he has been appointed as a caretaker or permanent head coach several times, with the latest head coach spell starting in October 2013. Kostyukov died on 17 December 2015.

References

External links
 Profile at Pressball.by
 Profile at KLISF

1954 births
2015 deaths
Belarusian footballers
Belarusian football managers
FC Dnepr Mogilev players
FC Dnepr Mogilev managers
FC Torpedo Mogilev players
Association football midfielders